Thagaste (or Tagaste) was a Roman-Berber city in present-day Algeria, now called Souk Ahras. The town was the birthplace of Saint Augustine.

History
Thagaste was originally a small Numidian village, inhabited by a Berber tribe into which Augustine of Hippo was born in AD 354. His mother Saint Monica was a Christian and his father Patricius (with Roman roots) was at first a pagan who later adopted Christianity.

The city was located in the north-eastern highlands of Numidia.

Thagaste was situated in a region full of dense forest. In antiquity, this area was renowned for its mounts, which were used as a natural citadel against different foreign invaders, including the Romans, the Byzantines, the Vandals, and the Umayyads.

During the Roman period, trading increased in the city, that flourished mainly under the rule of Septimius Severus. Thagaste became a Roman municipium in the first century of Roman domination. The city was mentioned by Pliny the Elder. As a municipium, Thagaste was settled by a few Roman Italian immigrants, but was mainly inhabited by romanized native Berbers.

Indeed, Roman historian Plinius (V,4,4) wrote that Tagaste was an important Christian center in Roman Africa. It had a basilica and a Roman Catholic diocese, the latter of which was the most important in Byzantine Numidia. There are three bishops of Thagaste known to history: Saint Firminus, Saint Alypius (friend of Saint Augustine), and Saint Gennarus.

The rich and powerful gens Valeria, later under Saint Melania, owned an estate nearby which was of such extent and importance as to include two episcopal sees, one belonging to the Catholic Church, the other to the Donatists. Some of the rooms of the villa were "filled with gold".

There is a tradition that Saint Augustine used to meditate under an olive tree on a hill of Thagaste: this tree still exists and is the place of reunion even now for the followers of Augustinian spirituality.

The Byzantines fortified the city with walls. It fell to the Umayyad Caliphate toward the end of the seventh century. After centuries of neglect, French colonists rebuilt the city, which is now called Souk Ahras.

Other data
Currently, philologists and researchers from the Canary Islands (Spain) have linked the Tagaste to Tegueste. The latter derives from *tegăsət, which means "humid" and is of Guanche origin, which had a Berber origin.

People related 
 Saint Monica
 Augustine of Hippo, Doctor of the Church
 Martianus Capella, author
 Apuleius, author
 Alypius of Thagaste, bishop celebrated on August 15
 Firmus and Rusticus, Christian martyrs (4th century)
 Tacfarinas, resisted Roman invasions

See also

 Mauretania Caesariensis
 Cuicul
 Hippo Regius
 Cirta
 Thagaste (diocese)

References

Bibliography
Benseddik, Nacéra.  Thagaste.Souk Ahras, ville natale de saint Augustin Ed. Inas. Alger, 2005.
 Laffi, Umberto. Colonie e municipi nello Stato romano  Ed. di Storia e Letteratura. Roma, 2007   
 Mommsen, Theodore. The Provinces of the Roman Empire Section: Roman Africa. (Leipzig 1865; London 1866; London: Macmillan 1909; reprint New York 1996) Barnes & Noble. New York, 1996 
 Smyth Vereker, Charles. Scenes in the Sunny South: Including the Atlas Mountains and the Oases of the Sahara in Algeria. Volume 2. Publisher Longmans, Green, and Company. University of Wisconsin. Madison,1871 ( Roman Thagaste )

Archaeological sites in Algeria
Roman towns and cities in Algeria
Former populated places in Algeria
Ancient Berber cities